Rei Fighter Gekitsui Senki is a flight simulation video game released in 2003 by Global A Entertainment. The game was released only in Japan.

2003 video games
Flight simulation video games
GAE (company) games
GameCube games
GameCube-only games
Japan-exclusive video games
Multiplayer and single-player video games
Shoot 'em ups
Video games developed in Japan